Rodrigo Gimeno Molina (born 21 September 1979), commonly known as Rodri, is a Spanish retired footballer who played mainly as a defensive midfielder.

He amassed Segunda División totals of 215 matches and seven goals over one full decade, representing four clubs.

Football career
Born in Valencia, Rodri started professionally with Albacete Balompié, but appeared very rarely with the first team, leaving precisely when they returned to La Liga in 2003 after a seven-year absence, to which he contributed by appearing in only six second division games.

Rodri subsequently established at CD Castellón, helping the club promote from the third level in his second year. Starting in 2007–08, he played three seasons with Hércules CF in division two.

On 18 August 2010, after helping the Alicante side return to the top flight after a 13-year absence – 17 matches, but only six complete – Rodri moved to Gimnàstic de Tarragona in the second tier. In January 2013, aged 33, he terminated his contract with the Catalans.

External links

1979 births
Living people
Spanish footballers
Footballers from Valencia (city)
Association football midfielders
Segunda División players
Segunda División B players
Tercera División players
Atlético Albacete players
Albacete Balompié players
CD Castellón footballers
Hércules CF players
Gimnàstic de Tarragona footballers